Events from the year 1559 in Ireland.

Incumbent
Monarch: Elizabeth I

Events
September 3 – Robert Dillon is appointed Chief Justice of the Irish Common Pleas.
Shane O'Neill is elected to succeed Conn O'Neill as The Ó Néill Mór.
Valentine Browne is appointed Surveyor General of Ireland by Queen Elizabeth.
William FitzWilliam is appointed Vice-Treasurer and acting Lord Chief Justice of Ireland.
 Approximate date – the Church of Ireland Bishopric of Mayo is united with the Archdiocese of Tuam.

Births
Christopher Holywood, Jesuit (d. 1626)

Deaths
March – Robert Plunkett, 5th Baron of Dunsany
Gerald Aylmer, judge (b. c.1500)
Conn O'Neill, 1st Earl of Tyrone (b. c.1480)
Approximate date – John Bathe, lawyer.

References

1550s in Ireland
Ireland
Years of the 16th century in Ireland